Pacoh may refer to:
 Pacoh people
 Pacoh language